Franjo Jurjević (22 November 1932 – 24 December 2022) was a Croatian gymnast. He competed in eight events at the 1952 Summer Olympics.

Jurjević died in Zagreb on 24 December 2022, at the age of 90.

References

1932 births
2022 deaths
Croatian male artistic gymnasts
Olympic gymnasts of Yugoslavia
Gymnasts at the 1952 Summer Olympics
Sportspeople from Bjelovar